Kiyā Buzurg-Ummīd (died 1138) was a dāʿī and the second ruler (da'i) of the Nizari Isma'ili State, ruling Alamut Castle from 1124 to 1138 CE (or 518—532 AH). He was of Daylami origin from the region of Rudbar.

Career
Prior to ruling the Nizari Isma'ilis, Buzurg Ummid captured Lambsar Castle for the Assassins and ruled it as commander for over twenty years.

As the ruler of Alamut

On 25 Rabīʿ II 518 (11 June 1124), a day before death of Ḥassan-i Ṣabbaḥ, Ḥassan appointed him his successor. He generally followed the policies of Ḥassan-i Ṣabbaḥ and enforced the Sharia strictly. In his early reign the Isma'ili hold was expanded in particular in Eshkevar and Taleghan.

As opposed to Hassan Sabbah, who is depicted as a revolutionary leader, the Ismaili sources depict Buzurg-Ummid as an administrator and a chivalrous lord (e.g. the story of him protecting his old enemy, emir Yaran-Qush Bazdar of Qazvin and his followers, who had fled to Alamut).

Another change in the Nizari government during his rule was the decrease in the number of assassinations; the list include the Abbasid caliph Al-Mustarshid, a prefect of Isfahan, a governor of Maragha, a prefect of Tabriz, and a mufti of Qazvin.

Kiya Buzurg Ummid died on 9 February 1138 and was succeeded by his son, Muhammad Buzurg Ummid, who was nominated as heir three days earlier.

Works
The text of a bedtime prayer, titled "Prayer in Bedtime" ( du'ā dar hingām-i khwāb) in Persian attributed to Kiya Buzurg Ummid, is preserved in a manuscript of the Institute of Ismaili Studies in London.

References

1138 deaths
Medieval legends
Iranian missionaries
Iranian Ismailis
People from Alamut
Year of birth unknown
Daylamites
12th-century Iranian people
Nizari da'is
Nizari Ismaili–Seljuk relations
People of the Nizari–Seljuk wars
12th-century Ismailis